Yann Dobo (born April 20, 1978 in Vincennes) is a French professional football player, who currently plays in the Championnat de France amateur for L'Entente SSG.

Career
Dobo played on the professional level in Ligue 2 for US Créteil-Lusitanos. He played for the main squad of AS Saint-Étienne in Coupe de France and Coupe de la Ligue.

References

1978 births
Living people
French footballers
Ligue 2 players
AS Saint-Étienne players
FC Libourne players
Angers SCO players
US Créteil-Lusitanos players
French sportspeople of Senegalese descent
Entente SSG players
Stade Montois (football) players
Association football midfielders